Ana María Solórzano Flores (born 15 October 1977) is a Peruvian lawyer and politician. She was elected to the Congress of the Republic of Peru for the 2011-2016 period, representing the Arequipa region under the Peru Wins. Solóranzo was President of the Congress from 2014 to 2015.

Biography

Early career
Solóranzo was born on 15 October 1977 in Arequipa. She graduated as a lawyer from the Catholic University of Santa María in 1999, and the following year, she took a course of specialisation in conciliation court. In the 2011 elections, she ran for the Peruvian Nationalist Party in the Arequipa constituency. Solóranz won with 59,471 preferential votes.

In the Government's legislative work she has been chairperson of the Intelligence Committee; Bureau of Peruvian Women Parliamentarians and the Parliamentary Friendship League, Peru-United States. Solóranz was also a member of the ordinary commissions of Energy and Mines Commission of Justice and Human Rights and Consumer Protection and Regulators of Public Services, in addition to being a member of the Subcommittee on Constitutional Accusations.

President of the Congress of the Republic of Peru
In July 2014, she was elected President of the Congress for the period 2014 – 2015 after 59 votes, against 57 votes won by the opposition candidate Javier Bedoya. The government party won for the fourth time and the direction of the Board of Congress, although, unlike the previous elections, it was necessary to go to a second ballot for the result.

References

1977 births
Living people
Presidents of the Congress of the Republic of Peru
People from Arequipa
Peruvian women lawyers
Peruvian Nationalist Party politicians
Catholic University of Santa María alumni
21st-century Peruvian lawyers
Women members of the Congress of the Republic of Peru